Touhfat Mouhtare is a Comorian writer, and the second published women writer from Comoros.

Early life and education 
Mouhtare was born 1986 in Moroni, Comoros. She has lived in various countries in Africa, and studied in France, where she received a master's degree in communications from the University of Paris.

Career 
She is the second published Comorian woman prose writer, after Coralie Frei, and has also published poetry. Ames suspendues, a collection of novellas, was published in 2011. Her first novel, Vert cru, was published in 2018. Her writings evolve around mythology, transgenerational memory, psychology, spirituality, and humanism.

Personal life 
As of 2022, she lived in Paris.

References

Living people
Comorian women writers
Comorian poets
Comorian women short story writers
Comorian women poets
21st-century short story writers
21st-century poets
21st-century women writers
University of Paris alumni
Comorian writers in French
Comorian expatriates in France
1986 births
People from Moroni, Comoros